The 1961 McNeese State Cowboys football team was an American football team that represented McNeese State College (now known as McNeese State University) as a member of the Gulf States Conference (GSC) during the 1961 NCAA College Division football season. In their fifth year under head coach Les DeVall, the team compiled an overall record of 7–2 with a mark of 4–1 in conference play, tying for first place in the GSC.

Schedule

References

McNeese State
McNeese Cowboys football seasons
McNeese State Cowboys football